The 1840 United States presidential election in Delaware took place between October 30 and December 2, 1840, as part of the 1840 United States presidential election. Voters chose three representatives, or electors to the Electoral College, who voted for President and Vice President.

Delaware voted for the Whig candidate, William Henry Harrison, over Democratic candidate Martin Van Buren. Harrison won Delaware by a margin of 10.1%.

Results

See also
 United States presidential elections in Delaware

References

Delaware
1840
1840 Delaware elections